James Thomas Cushing (4 February 1937 – 29 March 2002) was an American theoretical physicist and philosopher of science. He was professor of physics as well as professor of philosophy at the University of Notre Dame.

Life and career
He studied physics in several universities in the US, obtaining his BSc from Loyola University, Chicago, Illinois in 1959, his MSc from Northwestern University in 1960 and his PhD, also in physics, from the University of Iowa in 1963. He then performed research at the University of Iowa, the Imperial College in London and the Argonne National Laboratory, after which he joined the University of Notre Dame, initially as assistant professor from 1966 to 1969, then advancing to associate professor and, from 1978 onwards, as professor of physics. From 1990 to 1993, he additionally was professor of philosophy at the same university.

Cushing's main areas of research were the history and philosophy of 20th century physics and the foundations of quantum theory. He investigated in particular interpretations of quantum mechanics, including the historical reasons for the success of the Copenhagen interpretation over hidden-variable theories or the de Broglie–Bohm theory (causal interpretation of quantum mechanics).

Since 2004, an annual prize is awarded in honor of James T. Cushing to younger scholars for significant work in the history and philosophical foundations of modern physics.

Publications 
James T. Cushing has authored more than 100 scientific articles.

Books
 James T. Cushing, Philosophical Concepts in Physics: The Historical Relation between Philosophy and Scientific Theories, Cambridge University Press, 1998
 J. T. Cushing, A. Fine, S. Goldstein (eds.), Bohmian Mechanics and Quantum-Theory: An Appraisal, Kluwer Academic Publishers, Dordrecht 1996 (Boston Studies in the Philosophy of Science, 184)
 James T. Cushing, Quantum Mechanics: Historical Contingency and the Copenhagen Hegemony, The University of Chicago Press, 1994  (cloth)  (paper)
 James T. Cushing, Theory Construction and Selection in Modern Physics: The S Matrix, Cambridge University Press, 1990
 James T. Cushing and Ernan McMullin (eds.), Philosophical Consequences of Quantum Theory, University of Notre Dame Press, 1989
 James T. Cushing, C. F. Delaney and Gary Gutting (eds.), Science and Reality: Recent Work in the Philosophy of Science, University of Notre Dame Press, 1984
 James T. Cushing, Applied Analytical Mathematics for Physical Scientists, John Wiley and Sons, Inc., 651 pages (1975)

References

External links 
 James T. Cushing, curriculum vitae, University of Notre Dame

1937 births
2002 deaths
20th-century American physicists
Quantum physicists
Philosophers of science
Theoretical physicists
People from Long Beach, California
University of Notre Dame faculty
Northwestern University alumni
Loyola University Chicago alumni
University of Iowa alumni
20th-century American philosophers
Fellows of the American Physical Society